Helicia retusa is a species of plant in the family Proteaceae. It is endemic to Papua New Guinea.

References

Flora of Papua New Guinea
retusa
Vulnerable plants
Taxonomy articles created by Polbot